Compasso d'Oro (Golden Compass) is the name of an industrial design award originated in Italy in 1954 by the La Rinascente company from an original idea of Gio Ponti and Alberto Rosselli. From 1964 it has been hosted exclusively by Associazione per il Disegno Industriale (ADI). It is the first, and among the most recognized, awards in its field.  The prize aims to acknowledge and promote quality in the field of industrial designs made in Italy and is awarded by ADI.

History
The Compasso d′Oro was established in 1954, and now it is the highest honour in the field of industrial design in Italy, comparable to other prestigious international awards such as the Good Design award, iF Design Award, Red Dot Award, the Cooper-Hewitt National Design Awards, and the Good Design Award (Japan). It was the first award of its kind in Europe and soon took on an international dimension and relevance, multiplying the occasions on which the exhibitions of award-winning objects were held in Europe, the United States, Canada and Japan. The Castiglioni brothers contributed to establish the ADI and the Compasso d’Oro awards. Enzo Mari was president of the ADI from 1976 to 1979. At present the management department of the Compasso d'Oro is Italy Industrial Designing Association, and it is also the members of the International Industrial Designing Committee and the European Designing Bureau.

Since its inception, approximately 300 designs have been honoured the Award, covering a wide range of products such as racing bikes, portable sewing machines, desks, sofas, vases, clothes hangers, drawers, clocks, desk lamps, telephones, electric fans and coffee machines. Some of the awarded designs are exposed in Milan, in the Collection of the Premio Compasso d'Oro ADI. On 22 April 2004, the Ministry of Cultural Heritage and Activities and Tourism – through its Superintendency for Lombardy – declared the collection of "exceptional artistic and historical interest", thus making it part of the national cultural heritage.

List of Compasso d'Oro Awards

Trivia
The award is given as a Compass, the one invented by Adalbert Goeringer in 1893 to measure the Golden Section.

See also
Industrial design
List of industrial designers
List of Compasso d'Oro recipients by year (in Italian)

References

External links
The official web page of the Associazione per il Disegno Industriale

Further reading

Science and technology in Italy
Italian design
Design
Awards established in 1954
1954 establishments in Italy
Italian awards
Design awards
Industrial design awards
Compasso d'Oro Award recipients